Quercus eduardi (also spelt Quercus eduardii) is a species of oak tree. It is placed in Quercus section Lobatae.

References

eduardi
Endemic oaks of Mexico
Trees of Aguascalientes
Flora of the Sierra Madre Occidental
Taxa named by William Trelease